This is a gallery of flags of North American countries, territories and their affiliated international organizations.

International organizations

Intercontinental organizations

Intracontinental organizations

Flags of North American sovereign states

Flags of North American dependencies and other territories

Flags of North American cities

Flags of cities with over 1 million inhabitants.

Historical flags

See also 
 List of sovereign states and dependent territories in North America
 Subregions of North America

 Lists of flags of North American countries

 List of Antiguan and Barbudan flags
 List of Bahamian flags
 List of Barbadian flags
 List of Belizean flags
 List of Canadian flags
 List of Costa Rican flags
 List of Cuban flags
 List of Dominican flags
 List of Dominican Republic flags
 List of Guatemalan flags
 List of Haitian flags
 List of Jamaican flags
 List of Mexican flags
 List of Nicaraguan flags
 List of Trinidadian and Tobagonian flags
 List of flags of the United States

References 

 
North America
North America